Dovzhky mountain range is located  on the territory of Stryi-San Highland, which is located in Stryi Raion of Lviv Oblast.
Ridge Dovzhky height reaches –, maximum  (mountain Dovzhka). The surface of the Mountain Ridge Dovzhky is dissected by rivers valleys Oriava, Dovzhanka, Smozhanka and Krasnyanka, and covered with pine forests. The treeless surfaces is used for agricultural purposes.
The Mountain Ridge Dovzhky been announced as natural reserves "Dovzhky" (325,0 ha area) to preserve the oaks, spruce and beech. In the grass covering are uncommon species listed in the Red Book of Ukraine.

Gallery

References

External links 
 Заповідні урочища : Заповідне урочище «Довжки» / Львівське обласне управління лісового господарства .
 Природно-заповідний фонд — Офіційний сайт ДП «Славське лісове господарство». 

Geography of Lviv Oblast
Mountains of Ukraine
Mountains of the Eastern Carpathians